Two Doors Down is a Scottish television sitcom, produced by BBC Studios. It was created by Simon Carlyle and Gregor Sharp, and stars Arabella Weir, Alex Norton, Doon Mackichan, Jonathan Watson and Elaine C. Smith as neighbours in a suburban street in Scotland.
 
Following a one-off Hogmanay special broadcast nationwide on BBC One in late 2013, a full series was commissioned, and began airing on BBC Two in April 2016, with a second that November. A third series in 2018 (and a 2017 Christmas special) and a fourth in 2019 followed. A fifth series announced in mid-2020 was delayed until the following year due to the COVID-19 pandemic, and broadcast in two halves in December 2021 and July/August 2022, with a sixth series shown that November and December, its Christmas special airing on BBC One. A seventh series will film in summer 2023 for broadcast in the autumn, alongside a move to BBC One.

Two Doors Down won the Best Comedy award at the 2017 Royal Television Society Scotland Awards, with separate BAFTA Scotland wins for cast and crew over the course of its run.

Premise 
The series creator, Simon Carlyle, stated: "Two Doors Down is about crazy neighbours. We've all got them. They seem ok, but when you scratch the surface they're a bit nuts." Two Doors Down focuses on neighbours living side by side in a middle-class Glasgow suburb (differentiating it from many previous Glasgow-based sitcoms such as Rab C Nesbitt and Still Game which were set in gritty, run down areas of the city). BBC Scotland describes the characters as "not so happily living together" – the neighbours are constantly visiting uninvited, and overstaying their welcome, at Beth and Eric Baird's house. Beth is often taken advantage of by her neighbours, frequently having to make tea, pour drinks and prepare food, while the remaining characters chat in the living room. Eric and Beth therefore try and avoid their neighbours as much as possible so they can enjoy some peace and quiet in their own home.

Cast and characters

Timeline

Episodes

Pilot (2013)

Series 1 (2016)

Series 2 (2016)

Series 3 (2018)

Series 4 (2019)

Christmas Special (2020)

Series 5 (2021–22) 
Plans for a fifth series were formally announced in mid-2020, with filming originally set to start at that time delayed until March 2021 due to COVID-19 restrictions. Filming was subsequently interrupted by Joy McAvoy giving birth, and as a result was only completed on two episodes and the Christmas special. Filming resumed in February 2022.

The series resumed on 12 July 2022; the final three episodes of the series were made available on iPlayer on that date following the linear broadcast of "Brother Michael". In order to air the entire series in one run, the first two episodes were repeated (out-of-order) following the linear premiere of the last four episodes of the series.

Series 6 (2022) 
A sixth series was indirectly mentioned in the BBC's Annual Plan, published in March 2022, reported by cast members in July 2022 as table reads took place, and officially confirmed by the BBC in August 2022. The series consists of six episodes and a Christmas special. Doon Mackichan and her character Cathy no longer appear; she "has left [Colin] and now lives abroad", with plots for the series centring around the fact he "can't help oversharing personal details" about it. Actress Siobhan Redmond joined the cast as a new regular character, Anne Marie.

Following the broadcast of the first episode, the remaining episodes of the series (except the Christmas special) were made available on BBC iPlayer. The Christmas special, like the show's original pilot, aired on BBC One instead of BBC Two.

Series 7 (2023) 
Recommission for a seventh series was confirmed by Elaine C. Smith in January, but not by the BBC until February. The series will comprise six episodes, film in summer 2023, and be broadcast on BBC One in autumn 2023.

Production 
The pilot episode was shot with all the crew and cast in a "cramped, medium-sized living room". After the pilot was deemed successful, filming was moved to purpose-built sets in Dumbarton. Filming for the first series took place in the late summer and autumn of 2015.

Exterior scenes were filmed in Bishopbriggs, East Dunbartonshire; these were moved to Avonbrae Crescent in Hamilton, South Lanarkshire, from series 4.

Location filming for series 2 included Prestwick Airport and a local supermarket.

For the 2020 Christmas special, COVID-19 restrictions prompted changes to production, such as the entire cast and certain members of the crew isolating for two days prior to filming and doing so throughout the five-day shoot.

Critical reception 
Two Doors Downs initially mixed reception has grown more positive over the course of the show.

Writing for The Guardian, Ben Arnold said the first episode of the series was "a mundane set-up, not helped by a woeful lack of laughs," sentiments he repeated upon reviewing the start of the second series. The Arts Desk wrote that the series "owes an awful lot to both Abigail’s Party and The Royle Family, as well as socially awkward characters from any number of sketch shows, with equally broadly defined characters – only without the bits that make you laugh out loud." Writing for Radio Times, David Butcher said "Sometimes Two Doors Down is so uneventful it almost vanishes" but called it a "nicely sour-edged sitcom". Conversely, The Guardians Zoe Williams said, at the time of the first series, "this endearing ensemble BBC Comedy about a sort of Scottish neighbours has something-for-everyone humour," with The Observers Euan Ferguson writing, of the second series, that "[it] has it all. Wit, delight, long awkward silences, burps, bacon-farts."

A review of the series 3 opener by the is Sarah Hughes noticed the "nice, dry one liners (most of them delivered by the estimable Elaine C Smith) and an expert ensemble cast, who manage to make you if not quite laugh out loud then at least gently smile in recognition," shared by Chris Harvey of The Telegraph in his review, opining "Not all of the material was funny, but the acting carried it." With regards to series 4, The Heralds Alison Rowat commented that "the jokes ... are easier to see coming than before, but by this stage in the game the comedy is coming more from the characters than the situation".

Critical reaction to the 2020 special was overwhelmingly positive, with The Telegraphs Anita Singh calling it "one of the unsung gems of the festive season", saying it "takes a well-worn scenario ... and gives it some bite", and The Guardian's Rebecca Nicholson lauding praise on the cast, while noting that "for those of us missing family gatherings this year, this is an accurate re-enactment of some of its most awkward corners".

The series 5 opener received mixed reviews. Benji Wilson from The Telegraph, in a two-star review, claimed "[t]he storylines are so formulaic you're left wondering if this or that plot has already happened in the same episode, let alone in some other sitcom," but opined "[w]hat saves [the show] from the realms of utter dreck is the performances, which are the definition of making the best of a bad situation". The is Ed Power awarded four stars, admitting the episode "coasted along on a script that was gently droll rather than madly hilarious" yet "care was taken not to look down on the characters or suggest suburban life was some sort of beige hell," while, in a three-star review, The Timess Carol Midgley considered it "wasn't the funniest episode [she had] seen, but the writing is always tight and sharp" with "spot-on observations about the banal truths of normal life" and singled out Doon Mackichan and Elaine C. Smith as "consistently the funniest performers". The Christmas special's reviews skewed positive; The Telegraphs three-star review from Michael Hogan said that while "[the show] won't win any awards for originality", the episode was "a wryly witty treat which captured the claustrophobic domesticity of Christmas" with "its endearing warmth and estimable ensemble cast", with a four-star review from Radio Timess Huw Fullerton observing that "[t]he joy of Two Doors Down is that you can more or less predict what comes next [...] but the way the familiar beats develop is still laugh-out-loud funny, believable and even (in certain moments) a little bit festive," concluding it was "simple but well-observed character comedy".

The opening episode of series six had a mixed reaction, particularly regarding the loss of the character of Cathy. Benji Wilson, in a two-star review for The Telegraph, saying "Doon Mackichan was the funniest thing in Two Doors Down" and that "without her it lagged horribly", also opining that it would be "fine to remove her for a single episode in which her absence remains the main story, but for the balance of the show – for the jokes, frankly – she needs replacing, fast." Gerald Gilbert's three-star review for the i was less critical, and approved of Cathy's removal, stating that the character "regularly dominated a comedy that works better on more understated rhythms". Gilbert went on to praise the writing, saying a strength of it was that "it touches on the uncomfortable truth that many of us barely tolerate our supposed friends and neighbours", and "the gags are generally well-worked ... and expertly delivered". Alison Rowat, in The Herald, awarded the episode four stars, commenting that "[w]hen it comes to verbal riffs, writers Simon Carlyle and Gregor Sharp continue to be the closest thing Scotland has to Victoria Wood", and that a "superb cast take care of the rest", concluding that the show "is going to be just fine without ... what was her name again?"

Home media release 
All series and episodes of Two Doors Down have been made available on DVD.

References

External links 

 
 
 
 

2010s British sitcoms
2010s Scottish television series
2020s British sitcoms
2020s Scottish television series
2013 Scottish television series debuts
BBC Scotland television shows
BBC television sitcoms
Television series by BBC Studios
English-language television shows
Scottish satirical television shows
Scottish television sitcoms
Television shows set in Glasgow